Sylvia is a 1985 biographical film about New Zealand educator Sylvia Ashton-Warner, inspired by two of her books.
The film was directed and co-written by New Zealander Michael Firth, and stars British actor Eleanor David as Ashton-Warner, alongside Tom Wilkinson, Nigel Terry and Mary Regan.

The Village Voice critic Andrew Sarris rated Sylvia one of the ten best films of 1985. It also won praise from Vogue.

References

External links
 
 

1985 films
1980s New Zealand films
1980s English-language films
1980s biographical films
New Zealand biographical films
Films scored by Leonard Rosenman
Biographical films about writers